The following is the discography of Enslaved, a Norwegian heavy metal band formed in Haugesund in June 1991.

Studio albums

EPs

Demos

Split albums

Videos

Video albums

Other songs
 "Jizzlobber" (Faith No More cover) - Metal Hammer Goes 90s covermount CD / Decibel Flexi Series No. 87.

Music videos

References

External links
 Official website

Heavy metal group discographies
Discographies of Norwegian artists